"The Beautiful Occupation" is the second single from Scottish indie rock band Travis' fourth studio album, 12 Memories. The single peaked at #48 on the UK Singles Chart, becoming their worst performing single to date. The song was written by frontman Fran Healy and is a reflection of the anti-war sentiments of the War on Iraq, also carrying serious criticism to the invasion itself.

"The Beautiful Occupation" is available free at the Peace Not War site.

Track listing
 UK CD1
 "The Beautiful Occupation" - 3:47
 "The Score" - 4:19
 "I Don't Mean To Get High" - 2:58

 UK CD2
 "The Beautiful Occupation" - 3:47
 "Distraction" - 4:11
 "Back In The Day" - 3:23

 7" Vinyl
 "The Beautiful Occupation" - 3:47
 "I Don't Mean To Get High" - 2:58

 Minidisc
 "The Beautiful Occupation" - 3:47
 "Enemy" - 3:22

Charts

References

2003 singles
Travis (band) songs
Songs written by Fran Healy (musician)
Song recordings produced by Tchad Blake
2001 songs
Independiente (record label) singles
Songs of the Iraq War
Anti-war songs